George Vernon (1630–1692) was an English politician who sat in the House of Commons in the second half of the 17th century.

Vernon was born in Farnham. He was a JP and a Commissioner for Assessment; and a Major of Militia.

Notes

 

1630 births
1692 deaths
People from Farnham
English MPs 1685–1687